Tourism is one of the leading sources of income, crucial to Egypt's economy. At its peak in 2010, the sector employed about 12% of workforce of Egypt, serving approximately 14.7 million visitors to Egypt, and providing revenues of nearly $12.5 billion  as well as contributing more than 11% of GDP and 14.4% of foreign currency revenues.

History

The number of tourists in Egypt stood at 0.1 million in 1952. Tourism became an important sector of the economy from 1975 onwards, as Egypt eased visa restrictions for almost all European and North American countries and established embassies in new countries like Austria, Netherlands, Denmark and Finland. In 1976, tourism was a focal point of the Five Year Plan of the Government, where 12% of the budget was allocated to upgrading state-owned hotels, establishing a loan fund for private hotels, and upgrading infrastructure (including road, rail, and air connectivity) for major tourist centers along with the coastal areas. In 1979, tourism experts and advisors were brought in from Turkey and several new colleges were established with Turkish help between 1979 and 1981, to teach diploma courses in hospitality and tourism management. The tourist inflow increased to 1.8 million in 1981 and then to 5.5 million in 2000. Tourists arrivals reached a pinnacle in 2010 by reaching 14.7 million visitors. Revenues from tourism reached the highest point at $12.6 billion in the fiscal year 2018–2019.
In the year 2020, tourism-related revenues dropped by nearly 70% to $4 billion. Citing the Tourism and Antiquities Minister Khaled El-Enany, Egypt's tourist arrivals plunged to 3.5 million in 2020.
In February 2022, the managing director of the International Monetary Fund (IMF), Kristalina Georgieva in a publication disclosed that Egypt's tourism sector was the biggest loser of the Coronavirus Outbreak.

Impact of revolutions on tourism

During the Egyptian Revolution of 2011, the number of visitors plummeted by over 37% that year falling from 14 million in 2010 to 9 million by the end of 2011. This has impacted a diverse range of businesses directly or indirectly dependent on tourism, from travel accommodation and tourist attractions to car rental and air transportation, as well as health and wellness industries. Tour operators offering heavy discounts to encourage tourists back have been somewhat successful at the Red Sea resorts where prices remain lower compared to 2011.

In the first half of 2014, the number of tourists further declined by 25% as compared with the same period in 2013, while revenues shrank by 25% as well.

In 2013, Egypt ranked 85th as the world's best country in terms of tourism and traveling, falling ten places from its ranking of 75 in 2011. However, it regained some ground in the 2017 rankings being rated 75th overall. As of the 2019 rankings, Egypt ranks 65th overall.

Israelis can cross into Egypt for 14 days without a visa at certain areas near Taba and they come to enjoy areas on the Red Sea Riviera.  In 2017, the first group of Israelis visited the more popular tourist attractions with the aid of strong security. It had been 18 months since any group of Israeli tourists had visited Egypt.

In 2017, Bloomberg said Egypt has "shed its years of social and political unrest" and made the top 20 list of 2017 travel destinations. 
The latest United Nations World Tourism Organization (UNWTO) has revealed that Egypt is one of the world's fast-growing tourist destination. In 2017, the number rose to 8 million tourists compared to the previous year which was about 5.26 million.

Security

The tasks of tourism security in Egypt are carried out by the General Administration of Tourism and Antiquities Police, which is responsible for developing plans to secure tourists and protect antiquities, museums and cultural facilities within the framework of the general plan of the Egyptian Ministry of Interior. In order to fulfill the components of that mission, the administration secures the movement of tourist groups by paying close services to accompany the tour groups, securing tourist and archaeological facilities and sites, securing tourist and Nile cruises, combating tourism crimes that tourists may be exposed to and archaeological crimes, following-up tourism companies and shops and receiving notifications of tourists against them, publishing Police rescue vehicles that ensure the security presence in all tourist cities, and ensure the elimination of cases of trespassing. Given Egypt's Middle Eastern and African status, and its location in the midst of a regional conflict zone, it has been subject to several unfortunate terrorist incidents, the most famous of which is the Luxor incident in 1997, the Cairo incident in 2005, the Sharm el-Sheikh incident in 2005, the Dahab incident in 2006 and the downing of Metrojet Flight 9268. All combined have negatively affected the tourism sector during that period. However, the tourism sector returned and regained its activity quickly during the 2010s and especially after the most recent 2017 Hurghada attack to achieve the highest annual tourism revenues.

In May 2022, the case of two female tourists being harassed by 13 teenage boys surfaced, raising questions over the safety of tourists, especially female tourists, in the country. A 35-second video clip was recorded and shared by the guide accompanying the tourists, where the man was heard complaining about the Egyptian boys “running after foreigners” and addressing the tourism minister to look into the matter. The video showed a crowd of young boys closely approaching the two women, who constantly were appearing to get away. At one point, one of the women was seen pushing a boy away after another one around appeared touching her from the backside. A complaint of verbal and physical harassment was filed by the tour guide filming the incident. The boys who were aged between 13 and 15 years of age, claimed they simply wanted to click pictures with the tourists and not cause any distress. The boys were put under the custody of a juvenile detention center until further investigations, as per prosecution.

Statistics

Most tourists arriving to Egypt in 2019 came from the following territories:

In 2020, Egypt's tourism revenue dropped by about 70% to US$4 billion, reducing tourist arrivals to 3.5 million from 13.1 million in 2019. As stated by the Central Bank of Egypt (CBE), Egypt's revenues from tourism for the months of 2020-2021 fiscal year plunged by 67.4%. According to Khaled al-Anani, the average number of tourists who visited Egypt in April 2021 is nearly half of the average monthly number of 2019.

The highest number of tourist arrivals to Egypt in 2019 (before the international Coronavirus pandemic) was from Germany (2.5 million arrivals) followed by Ukraine (1.5 million), Saudi Arabia (1.4 million) and Libya (0.75 million).

Major attractions

Major tourist destinations include the millennia-old monuments in the Nile Valley. Principal among them are the Pyramids and Great Sphinx at Giza, the Abu Simbel temples south of Aswan and the Karnak Temple Complex and Valley of the Kings near Luxor. Attractions in Cairo include the Cairo Museum and the Mosque of Muhammad Ali Pasha. The coast of the Sinai Peninsula has well-visited seaside resorts, in addition to Hurghada City on the Red Sea coast and the Famous El Gouna Resort 25 km Hurghada.

Giza,  20 km southwest of Cairo, has several remains from the 26th century BC such as temples and monuments to pharaohs including the Great Sphinx, and the Great Pyramids of Giza.
Saqqara, 30 km south of Cairo is a vast, ancient burial ground which served as the necropolis for the Ancient Egyptian capital of Memphis. It features numerous pyramids, including the world's oldest standing step pyramid, as well as a number of mastabas.
Luxor, about 500 km south of Cairo, is the site of the ancient city of Thebes. It includes the ruins of the temple complexes at Karnak and Luxor, which stand within the modern city. On the opposite side of the Nile River lie the monuments, temples and tombs on the West Bank Necropolis, which include the Valley of the Kings and Valley of the Queens.

Abu Simbel, about 850 km south of Cairo (near the Egypt–Sudan border) is an archaeological site comprising two massive rock temples originally carved out of a mountainside during the reign of Pharaoh Ramesses II (13th century BC). The complex was relocated in its entirety in the 1960s to avoid being submerged during the creation of Lake Nasser. They are now situated on an artificial hill made from a domed structure high above the Aswan High Dam reservoir.
Alexandria is a main summer resort, due to its beaches, ancient history and Museums, especially the Bibliotheca Alexandrina, a modern project based on reviving the ancient Library of Alexandria.
Sinai Peninsula- Sinai has the beach resorts of Sharm el-Sheikh, Dahab, Nuweiba and Taba as well as locations mentioned in the Bible such as Mount Sinai ("Jabal Musa"). Saint Catherine's Monastery may be the oldest working Christian monastery in the world.
Ain Sukhna, about 110 km east of Cairo has a number of beach resorts.
Assiut:in south of Egypt has historic buildings from the time of the pharaohs and ancient mosques.
 Hurghada and El Gouna resort on the Red Sea Coast, 25 km from Hurghada International Airport, are both famous for their beaches, snorkeling and diving, and El Gouna is famous for its nightlife.

Ancient Egypt
The civilization of Ancient Egypt left many monuments and temples that have become attractions for modern-day visitors to Egypt. These include:

Pyramids: there are more than 70 pyramids along the Nile, with the three pyramids of Giza being the best-known. The Sphinx, a lion-bodied guard, stands beside pyramids in Giza. The pyramids were built more than 4,000 years ago in the eras of Kings Cheops, Kefren and Mykerinos. These three kings' bodies were buried within the pyramids. The pyramid of Cheops is the largest at 145 meters in height, and is referred to as the Great Pyramid.

Saqqara Complex: The vast necropolis of Saqqara including Memphis is located 24 kilometers south of central Cairo. Memphis was founded in about 3000 BC by Menes, along with 11 other pyramids. Memphis was the administrative capital of ancient Egypt. Saqqara has Zoser's funerary complex, Mereruka's tomb and the Serapeum, a complex of subterranean vaults that housed mummified Apis bulls, some in gargantuan granite coffins.

Valley of the Kings in Thebes: Due to theft from tombs within pyramids, 26 pharaohs of the eighteenth to twentieth dynasties including Tutankhamun, Ramses the Great and Tuthmosis III had their tombs carved into the rock of the Valley of Kings. There are further tombs in the Valley of the Queens.

Nile cruises

Cruises are offered along the Nile ranging from short tours between Luxor and Aswan to longer cruises that include the northern town of Dendera.

In the past, it used to work all the way from Cairo to Aswan for more than two weeks, but due to the development of the Nile, they stopped doing Nile Cruises all the way from Cairo, and it is now working from Luxor to Aswan.

Nile Cruises History 
Nile Cruising started during the early 19th century when Ibrahim Pasha of Egypt made his journey up and down The Nile.

Many cruises are aboard a larger vessel that functions as a floating hotel. Other Nile trips can be on a felucca, a traditional sailboat, on which overnight journeys may require passengers to sleep in the open air on deck and the sailors to double as cooks.

Between October and mid April the daytime temperatures are cooler and the Nile's locks are open. From around the middle of April locks on the river are closed in order to manage water levels, requiring passengers to disembark on one side of the lock and transfer to another boat on the other side.

Transportation
Passports and visas are required of foreign visitors except natives of several Middle Eastern countries.  Travelers native to most of Africa must have proof of cholera and yellow fever vaccination.

Airports
There are nine international airports in Egypt that serve all of the county's major cities including Cairo International Airport and Taba International Airport.

Cairo International Airport is the main gateway to Egypt and is located about 15 miles northeast of the city in northern Egypt. Cairo's three terminals receive flights from all major world cities including those in North America, Europe, Asia and Africa. Central Cairo is accessible from the airport by bus, taxi, or limousine.

Located in central Egypt, Luxor International Airport serves the Nile Valley and acts as a gateway to tourist destinations of the region. It has connections from the UK, Germany, Russia, France, Italy, and Turkey. Two terminals serve international and domestic flights, with a number of Egyptian carriers including Air Cairo and Egypt Air operating from the airport. The airport is located close to the city centre and taxis, limos and regular buses are available for transfers into the city.

Railways

Egyptian Railways is the backbone of passenger transportation in Egypt, with 800 million passenger miles annually.

Air-conditioned passenger trains usually have 1st and 2nd class service, while trains without air condition will have 2nd and 3rd class. Most of the network connects the densely populated area of the Nile delta with Cairo and Alexandria as hubs.

The Alexandria-Cairo-Luxor-Aswan link is served daily in both directions by air-conditioned sleeper trains of Abela Egypt. This service is especially attractive to tourists who can spend the night on the train as it covers the stretch between Cairo and Luxor. A luxury express train also connects Cairo with Marsa Matruh towards the Egypt–Libya border.

Egyptian currency

The currency of Egypt is the Egyptian pound ( or ج.م  – abbreviated to "LE" or "L.E." – livre égyptienne, "Egyptian pound" in French). The pound is divided into 100 piastres. The Central Bank of Egypt controls the circulation of currency.

There is no limit on the amount of currency which the visitors may bring to Egypt, however, they must declare the currency and amount upon arrival and departure with bank receipts. There may be restrictions on the amount of currency that can be taken outside of Egypt, and generally it should not exceed .

Climate

Peak tourist season in Egypt runs from mid October to May, during winter and spring. From May until October daytime temperatures are relatively high, especially in Luxor and the southern parts of the country.

Egypt is one of the hottest and sunniest countries in the world. With the exception of a strip along the Mediterranean coast, Egypt has a desert climate, being entirely within the Sahara. The Mediterranean coastal strip has an average annual rainfall of 100–200 mm. In central and southern Egypt several years may pass without any significant rain.

Winters are generally warm in the south of Egypt, but temperatures fall abruptly at night, especially in the desert. In summer southern Egypt is very hot with low air humidity.

Gallery

See also

 Cultural tourism in Egypt
 Visa policy of Egypt

References

External links

 Egyptian Tourism – Official government tourism agency

 
Egypt